Rowland Leigh (1902 – 1963) was an aristocratic Anglo-American lyricist, screenwriter, and librettist, who worked with many famous actors and musicians during his career on Broadway and in Hollywood.

Family
His mother, Hon Mrs Leigh, was the youngest daughter of General William Washington Gordon and he was in remainder to the peerage title of Baron Leigh, through his father the Hon Rowland Leigh (1859–1943).

Leigh married 17 November 1937 Catherine de Bernard de La Fosse, daughter of Vicomte Pierre de Bernard de La Fosse, of Château de Beaumont, Loir-et-Cher, France, but they had no children and divorced in 1943.

Works

Filmography

Stage works

See also
 Baron Leigh

References

External links

1902 births
1963 deaths
American lyricists
American male screenwriters
American librettists
Musicians from New York City
Songwriters from New York (state)
Screenwriters from New York (state)
20th-century American male writers
20th-century American screenwriters
British emigrants to the United States